Ridabu Idrettslag is a Norwegian association football from Ridabu, Hamar, Innlandet.

The men's football team plays in the 4. divisjon, the fifth tier of Norwegian football.

References

Official site

Football clubs in Norway
Sport in Hamar
1965 establishments in Norway
Association football clubs established in 1965